Pedinellales is a group of single-celled algae found in both marine environments and freshwater.

These are found in both freshwater and marine environments, and most genera are sessile, attached by posterior stalks.  The flagellum is at the anterior of the cell, and the tentacles surround it, often capturing small prey drawn in by its current.  The colored genera are Pedinella, Apedinella, Pseudopedinella, and Mesopedinella.  Several more genera have lost their chloroplasts and feed entirely by phagocytosis.  These are Parapedinella, Actinomonas, and Pteridomonas.

It also appears that certain heliozoa are actually derived pedinellids.  Ciliophrys alternates between a mobile flagellate stage and a heliozoan feeding stage, where the body is contracted with extended axopods all over its surface, and the flagellum is curled up into a tight figure eight.  The actinophryids, Actinophrys and Actinosphaerium, exist only in a heliozoan form with no flagellum and with more elaborate bundles of microtubules supporting their axopods.  Their inclusion was argued by Mikrjukov and Patterson, who coined the term actinodine to refer specifically to this extended group.

Pedinellids were classified as heliozoans by some authors. The colored pedinellids were originally treated as a family of golden algae in the order Ochromonadales, promoted to an order Pedinellales by Zimmerman in 1984. Their relationship to the silicoflagellates became apparent some time later, and Patterson defined this rankless group for the two in 1994.  Moestrup treated it as the class Dictyochophyceae, previously restricted to the silicoflagellates, while Cavalier-Smith defined a new class Actinochrysophyceae for them.

Taxonomy
Taxonomy provided by AlgaeBase.
 Family Cyrtophoraceae Pascher 1911
 Genus Cyrtophorana Strand 1929
 Genus Palatinella Lauterborn 1906
 Family Pedinellaceae Pascher 1910 [Actinomonadaceae Kent 1880; Ciliophryidae Poche 1913; Pedinellidae Cavalier-Smith 1986 stat. nov. 1995; Pseudopedinellaceae]
 Genus Actinomonas Kent 1880
 Genus Apedinella Throndsen 1971
 Genus Ciliophrys Cienkowski 1876
 Genus Helicopedinella Sekiguchi et al. 2003
 Genus Mesopedinella Daugbjerg 1996
 Genus Parapedinella Pedersen, Beech & Thomsen 1986
 Genus Pedinella Wyssotzki 1887 non Dahl 1909
 Genus Pseudopedinella Carter 1937
 Genus Pteridomonas Penard 1889

References

Heterokont orders
Dictyochophyceae